Killman Zoo is located approximately  north of Caledonia in Haldimand County, Ontario, Canada. It was opened on April 1, 1988, as a natural progression of the Killman's Wildlife Sanctuary.

Summary
It is a privately owned and operated zoo using  of trails on a property spanning . There are gift shops and picnic facilities; which allow guests to eat pre-packaged food at the zoo. Tamer animals like dwarf goats and deer can be petted by people of all ages at the special petting zoo portion of the attraction. People with wheelchairs are able to access the sights with wheelchair-accessible trails.

The Killman family that operates the zoo are descended from the Seneca, Onondaga and Mohawk Tribes of the Canadian First Nations. An adult ticket costs $18.50 while a child's ticket costs $10.50. The zoo is an ongoing project and expansion is commonly taking place.

There are a wide range of animals including lemurs, porcupines, coyotes, wolves, birds of prey, bear and approximately 30 exotic cats. The cats make up a large portion of the zoo including lions, tigers, jaguars, lynx, bobcats and cougars. You can get as close to 5 feet to these animals.

External links
The Killman Zoo

1988 establishments in Ontario
Buildings and structures in Haldimand County
Tourist attractions in Haldimand County
Zoos in Ontario
Zoos established in 1988